Slow Learners is a 2015 American romantic comedy film directed by Don Argott and Sheena M. Joyce and starring Adam Pally, Sarah Burns, Reid Scott, Catherine Reitman, and Kevin Dunn. An indie, romantic comedy film, it follows two friends who embark on a journey of self-discovery when they decide to help each other become "bad" and "crazy."

Cast
Adam Pally as Jeff Lowry
Sarah Burns as Anne Martin
Reid Scott as Max
Catherine Reitman as Julia
Mary Grill as Beth
Kate Flannery as Principal Miller
Kevin Dunn as Darren Lowry
Marceline Hugot as Joyce Lowry
Frances Callier as Robin
Ursula Parker as Little Miss Trooper
Angela Shelton as Michelle
Gil Ozeri as Dan
Cecily Strong as The Ex
Bobby Moynihan as Lenny
Peter Grosz as Dr. Mark Sonderskov

Production
In October 2011, producer O'Connor provided the seed money for the movie to get started while O'Connor and the other producers spent 2012 trying to acquire the funding necessary to begin filming.

Casting
On April 16, 2014, Adam Pally was cast in the lead role.

Filming
Principal photography began in May 2014 and was conducted in and around Media, Philadelphia.

Filming commenced on May 28, 2014, after a month-long shoot.

Release
Tiehel-Stedman said of producers: "they will have the task to shop the film to festivals and look for distribution opportunities. It will take nearly 18 months in post production before general audiences have their chance to laugh" thus suggesting theatrical release of Bad Boys Crazy Girls in late 2015.

References

External links

2010s English-language films
2010s American films
American romantic comedy films